The Kemah Boardwalk is a 60-acre Texas Gulf Coast theme park in Kemah, Texas, approximately 30 miles southeast of Downtown Houston, Texas. The Boardwalk is built entirely along the shores of Galveston Bay and Clear Lake. The complex is owned and operated by Landry's, Inc., and is home to more than 10 restaurants, a collection of rides, midway games, attractions, a boutique hotel, a charter yacht, a 400-slip marina and multiple shops. There is no charge to walk around on the boardwalk. Tickets for rides can be purchased individually or all-day ride passes are available.

History
Landry's, Inc. acquired property along the Kemah Waterfront in 1997 and opened the Kemah Boardwalk in 1998. In 2007, the Boardwalk Bullet, a high-speed wooden roller coaster opened on the boardwalk. The 96-foot-tall, 3,236-foot-long roller coaster is built on a 1-acre footprint, making it one of the most compact roller coasters in the world.

A new source published on December 27 of 2012 stated how an evacuation happened because of a device that was spotted on the broad walk near southeast of Houston on Galveston. Luckily the police was able to get everyone out safely and noticed it was just a military device.

The missing body of a five year old by the name of Fiona was found in the water near the Kemah Broadwalk. She was last seen on the marina dock with her father before going missing. There was no foul play found in the autopsy.

Rides and attractions

Current attractions
 Boardwalk Bullet - Gravity Group Wooden Coaster
 Wonder Wheel - Kiddie Ferris Wheel
 Double-Decker Carousel
 Century Wheel - Ferris Wheel 
 C.P. Huntington Train
 Hypno Spin - Tilt-a-Whirl
 Boardwalk Tower - Observation Tower
 Jungle Bounce - Kiddie Drop Tower
 Aviator - Chance Rides Aviator
 Pharaoh's Fury - Swinging Ship
 Drop Zone - Drop Tower
 Rockin' Rocket - Rockin Tug 
 Flare - Super Loop
 Iron Eagle - Zip Line

Former attractions
 Inverter
 Chaos
 Wipeout

References

External links
 Official website

1997 establishments in Texas
Amusement parks in Texas
Amusement parks opened in 1997
Buildings and structures in Galveston County, Texas
Galveston Bay Area
Greater Houston
Landry's Restaurants, Inc. amusement parks
Restaurants in Houston
Tourist attractions in Galveston County, Texas